Wendy Bennett may refer to:
 Wendy Ayres-Bennett, English linguist
Wendy Bennett (athlete), competitor in the 2001 AAA Championships